Dexter Community House, also known as The Roundhouse, is a historic building located in Dexter, Iowa, United States. Several prominent members of the community were responsible for the fundraising and building of this community facility. It replaced an older facility that was used for revival meetings, social and entertainment functions. After $10,000 had been raised Major Matt King drew up the plans for the building, which was completed in 1917. It continues to be used for a variety of community functions, and for a time it was used as a high school gymnasium. The exterior is composed of hollow blocks, and they are the support for the dome roof. The interior walls are finished with sandstone. A large stage is located opposite the main entrance. It was added to the National Register of Historic Places in 1975.

References

Buildings and structures completed in 1917
Buildings and structures in Dallas County, Iowa
National Register of Historic Places in Dallas County, Iowa
Event venues on the National Register of Historic Places in Iowa